John A. Hartle (August 6, 1891 – April 5, 1979) was a Minnesota Republican politician and a Speaker of the Minnesota House of Representatives. Born on a farm, he became a livestock farmer himself. He was elected to the Minnesota House of Representatives in 1934. As a Republican, he caucused with the Conservative Caucus in the then-nonpartisan body.

Hartle served as chair of the Markets and Marketing and Civil Administration committees, and in 1949 he was elected to replace outgoing speaker Lawrence M. Hall. Hartle served as speaker for three terms, until the Liberal Caucus gained a majority in 1955. Hartle served one term as Minority Leader, and when the conservatives regained control of the body in 1963, he became chair, first of the education committee, and then the taxes committee. He retired from the legislature after the 1968 elections. His nephew Dean Hartle also served in the Minnesota Legislature.

References

 

1891 births
1979 deaths
People from Owatonna, Minnesota
Farmers from Minnesota
Speakers of the Minnesota House of Representatives
Republican Party members of the Minnesota House of Representatives
20th-century American politicians
People from Steele County, Minnesota